The 2018 African Judo Championships were the 39th edition of the African Judo Championships, organised by the African Judo Union. The events took place in Tunis, Tunisia from 12–15 April 2018.

Medal overview

Men

Women

Medal table

Participating nations
There were a total of 182 participants from 25 nations.

References

External links
 

African Judo Championships
Judo, African Championships
African Championships
Judo, 2018 African Championships
Judo, 2018 African Championships
Judo competitions in Tunisia
Judo, African Championships